The Black Sun is a type of sun wheel symbol originating in Nazi Germany and later employed by neo-Nazis and other far-right individuals and groups. The symbol's design consists of twelve radial sig runes, similar to the symbols employed by the SS in their logo. It first appeared in Nazi Germany as a design element in a castle at Wewelsburg remodeled and expanded by the head of the SS, Heinrich Himmler, which he intended to be a center for the SS.

It is unknown whether the design had a name or held any particular significance among the SS. Its association with the occult originates with a 1991 German novel, Die Schwarze Sonne von Tashi Lhunpo ("The Black Sun of Tashi Lhunpo"), by the pseudonymous author Russell McCloud. The book links the Wewelsburg mosaic with the neo-Nazi concept of the "Black Sun", invented by former SS officer Wilhelm Landig as a substitute for the Nazi swastika.

The Anti-Defamation League notes that though the symbol is popular with white supremacists, imagery resembling the black sun features in many cultures, and should be analysed in the context it appears, and not necessarily interpreted as a sign of white supremacy or racism.

Wewelsburg mosaic and the Nazi period

The symbol that later became known as the "black sun" originated in the early 20th century, with the first depiction being the Wewelsburg mosaic. In 1933, Heinrich Himmler, the head of the SS, acquired Wewelsburg, a castle near Paderborn in the German region of Westphalia. Himmler intended to make the building into a center for the SS, and between 1936 and 1942, Himmler ordered the building expanded and rebuilt for ceremonial purposes. Himmler's remodeling included the Wewelsburg mosaic that was composed of twelve dark-green radially overlaid sig runes, such as those employed in the logo of the SS, on the white marble floor of the structure's north tower known as the "General's Hall". The intended significance of the image remains unknown.

Some scholars have suggested that the artist may have found inspiration from motifs found on decorative Merovingian period discs from Central Europe, which have been suggested to represent the sun, or it's passing through the year.

Neo-Nazism

In the late 20th century, the Black Sun symbol became widely used by neo-fascist, neo-Nazi, the far-right and white nationalists. The symbol often appears on extremist flags, t-shirts, posters, websites and in extremist publications associated with such groups.

The name "Black Sun" came into wider use after the publication of a 1991 occult thriller novel, Die Schwarze Sonne von Tashi Lhunpo (The Black Sun of Tashi Lhunpo), by the pseudonymous author Russell McCloud. The book links the Wewelsburg mosaic with the neo-Nazi concept of the "Black Sun", invented by former SS officer Wilhelm Landig as a substitute for the Nazi swastika and a symbol for a mystic energy source that was supposed to renew the Aryan race.

A number of far-right groups and individuals have utilised the symbol in their propaganda, including the Christchurch mosque shooter Brenton Tarrant and Australian neo-Nazi group Antipodean Resistance, and the symbol was displayed by members of several extremist groups involved in the Unite the Right rally in Charlottesville, Virginia.

Scholar Chris Mathews writes:

The Ukrainian Azov Regiment, founded in 2014, used the symbol as part of its logo. Political scientist Ivan Gomza wrote in Krytyka that the illiberal connotations of the symbol in that logo are lost on most people in Ukraine, and the logo rather has an association with "a successful fighting unit that protects Ukraine." WotanJugend, a neo-Nazi group based in Kyiv and connected to the broader Azov political movement, has also used the Black Sun symbol to promote its group. During the 2022 Russian invasion of Ukraine, NATO tweeted a photo of a female Ukrainian soldier for International Women's Day. The soldier wore a symbol on her uniform that "appears to be the black sun symbol". After receiving complaints from social media users, NATO removed the tweet and stated "The post was removed when we realised it contained a symbol that we could not verify as official".

In May 2022, a mass shooting in Buffalo, New York occurred. The shooter, a white supremacist, wore the Black Sun symbol on his body armor and placed it on the front of his digital manifesto. Pro-Kremlin Telegram channels and influencers subsequently spread misinformation linking the shooter with the Azov Regiment and the Ukrainian nation more broadly. However, the shooter makes no reference to the Azov Regiment in his manifesto, and Ukraine receives only a single mention in a section plagiarized from an earlier mass shooter's manifesto that predates the Russian invasion of Ukraine.

On 1 September 2022, a man with a Black Sun arm tattoo (Fernando André Sabag Montiel) attempted to assassinate Argentinian vice president Cristina Fernández de Kirchner.

Other uses 
According to Freedom House initiative Reporting Radicalism, the Black Sun is also used by some Modern pagan and satanist groups as an esoteric symbol. They further note that it is sometimes used as a fashionable, aesthetic symbol, or misunderstood as having origins in ancient Scandinavian or Slavic cultures. The Anti-Defamation League notes that though the symbol is popular with white supremacists, imagery resembling the black sun features in many cultures, and should be analysed in the context it appears, and not necessarily interpreted as a sign of white supremacy or racism.

See also

 Esotericism in Germany and Austria
 Fascist symbolism
 
 List of symbols designated by the Anti-Defamation League as hate symbols
 List of occult symbols
 Nazi symbolism
 Sun cross
 Thule-Seminar

References
Informational notes

Citations

Bibliography

External links

Esotericism
Fascist symbols
Germanic mysticism
Nazi symbolism
Neo-Nazi concepts
Solar symbols
Magic symbols
Occultism in Nazism